Luiz Mattar won in the final 6–4, 5–7, 6–4 against Martín Jaite.

Seeds
A champion seed is indicated in bold text while text in italics indicates the round in which that seed was eliminated.

  Luiz Mattar (champion)
  Horacio de la Peña (quarterfinals)
  Martín Jaite (final)
  Eduardo Bengoechea (quarterfinals)
  Cássio Motta (semifinals)
  Javier Frana (first round)
  Todd Witsken (semifinals)
  Tim Wilkison (first round)

Draw

External links
 1989 Rio de Janeiro Open draw

1989 Singles
1989 Grand Prix (tennis)